The Nebraska Christa McAuliffe Prize For Courage and Excellence in Education is an award given annually to recognize a teacher in Nebraska for showing courage in education. Founded in 1987 this award was founded in memorial to Christa McAuliffe, the teacher/astronaut who lost her life in the Challenger space shuttle accident in January, 1986. This fund provides a way to recognize these teachers, and at the same time honor the memory of Ms. McAuliffe's courage. Among the recipients of the Mcauliffe Prize over the past 20 years have been teachers who exemplified courage in many ways, including befriending and helping deaf people expand their capacity to learn despite a closed learning center to virtually adopting students and helping them out financially while fighting school bureaucracy. The winning teacher receives a $1000 stipend and a plaque that is presented at a banquet held in his or her honor. This year the winning school will receive a $500 award to help support important school activities.

Recipients

2018 - Elena Garcia
2017 - Cheyenne Janssen 
2016 - Joe DiCostanzo
2015 - LeeAnn Vaughn
2014 - Pam Mitchell 
2013 - Kimberly Snyder
2012 - Bryan Corkle
2011 - Kathy Bohac
2010 - Lynn Channer
2010 - Rhonda Josten
2009 - Nancy Lueking
2008 - Doug Keel
2007 - Calvin Rife
2005 - Dianne Epp
2004 - Joan Christen
2003 - Doris Martin
2002 - Susan Weber
2001 - Lorrie Schrad
2000 - Jamalee Stone
1999 - Kathy Stockham
1998 - Libby Putz
1997 - Roger Kassebaum
1996 - Genevieve Ramsey
1995 - Sandra Fabry
1994 - Ronald Callan
1993 - KrisAnn Sullivan
1992 - Mildred Mobley
1991 - Michael Tolfa
1990 - Susan McNeil
1989 - John Keenan
1988 - Laurie Moriarty
1987 - Barbara Hopkins

Nominations for this award can be submitted to the University of Nebraska-Lincoln through their website and is open to any Nebraska teacher that demonstrates courage in education.

References

External links 
 courage.unl.edu - The University of Nebraska-Lincoln site on the Christa McAuliffe Prize

Christa McAuliffe Prize
Awards established in 1987